Beauregard-de-Terrasson (literally Beauregard of Terrasson) is a commune in the Dordogne department in southwestern France.

Population

See also
Communes of the Dordogne department

References

Communes of Dordogne